The Tangkak District is a district in western Johor, Malaysia, bordering Malacca to the west. The district also shares a 2 kilometre border with Negeri Sembilan to the northwest. The district capital and largest city is Tangkak Town.

Geography
The district covers Tangkak town, Tanjung Agas, Kesang, Sungai Mati, Serom, Sagil and Bukit Gambir..

History
The district was previously an autonomous sub-district (daerah kecil) covering the north-western part of the Muar District, separated from Muar Town proper by the Muar River. A ceremony headed by the sultan on 9 June 2008 saw the official proclamation of that part becoming Johor's 10th district, then named Ledang District after the eponymous mountain located within its borders. The district was then renamed Tangkak District at the end of 2015 by a decree of Sultan Ibrahim Ismail to preserve the historical value of traditional name of places in the state.

Administrative divisions

Tangkak District is divided into:

Mukims
 Bukit Serampang
 Grisek
 Kesang
 Kundang
 Serom
 Tangkak

Towns (Bandar)
 Bukit Kangkar
 Parit Bunga
 Serom
 Sungai Mati
 Tangkak

Towns (Pekan)
 Grisek

Townships
 Tangkak
 Kesang
 Tanjung Agas
 Bukit Gambir
 Sungai Mati
 Parit Bunga
 Bukit Kangkar
 Pekan Rawang
 Bukit Serampang
 Kundang Ulu
 Serom
 Kesang, Tg Gading
 Sagil
 Kebun Bahru
 Gerisek

Demographics

Federal Parliament and State Assembly Seats

List of Tangkak district representatives in the Federal Parliament (Dewan Rakyat) 

List of Tangkak district representatives in the State Legislative Assembly (Dewan Negeri)

Economy
The main economy activities in the district are lifestyle tourism, adventure sports, light manufacturing and agriculture. Main industrial areas in the district are Desa Serom, Desa Sungai Mati, Gerisek, Sagil and Tangkak Industrial Areas.

Tourist attractions

Mount Ledang National Park

One of the main tourist attractions of Tangkak is the Gunung Ledang National Park. The park is situated 170 km from Johor Bahru and has an area of 107 km². The park has two entry points, one in Sagil, Johor and the other in Asahan, Malacca. Mount Ophir's peak, which is 1276 m above sea level is the highest point in the park and Johor. Mount Ophir is also the 64th highest mountain in Malaysian and has been climbed by many people. Sagil Waterfall, which is also in the park is a famous picnic site. Mount Ledang is also widely recognised as a friendly training venue for amateur (or beginners) mountain hikers/climbers.

See also
 Legend of Gunung Ledang

References